The following street, interurban, or other electric railways operated in New Jersey.  Companies marked (PS) were or became part of the Public Service Corporation of New Jersey.

American Railways Company
Asbury Park and Belmar Street Railway
Asbury Park and Sea Girt Railroad
Atlantic City Electric Railway
Atlantic City and Ocean City Railroad
Atlantic City and Shore Railroad
Atlantic City and Suburban Traction Company
Atlantic City Transportation Company
Atlantic Coast Electric Railroad
Atlantic Coast Electric Railway
Atlantic Highlands, Red Bank and Long Branch Electric Railway
Atlantic and Suburban Railway
Bay Head and Point Pleasant Street Railway
Bergen County Traction Company (PS)
Bergen Turnpike Company (PS)
Bridgeton and Millville Traction Company
Bridgeton Rapid Transit Company
Brigantine Transit Company
Brigantine Transportation Company
Brunswick Traction Company (PS)
Burlington County Railway
Burlington County Transit Company
Burlington County Traction Company
Camden and Atlantic Railroad (freight railroad with streetcars)
Camden, Gloucester and Woodbury Railway (PS)
Camden Horse Railroad (PS)
Camden and Suburban Railway (PS)
Camden and Trenton Railway (PS)
Cape May, Delaware Bay and Sewell's Point Railroad
Cape May and Schellinger's Landing Railroad
Cape May and Sewell's Point Railroad
Cape May Transportation Company
Central Electric Railway (PS)
Central Passenger Railway
City Railway
Clinton Avenue Horse Railway
Coast Cities Railway
Consolidated Traction Company of New Jersey (PS)
Cumberland Traction Company
Delaware Bay and Cape May Railroad
Delaware Valley Traction Company
East Jersey Street Railway (PS)
East Jersey Traction Company (PS)
Easton and Washington Traction Company
Elizabeth Street Railway (PS)
Elizabeth City Horse Railroad (PS)
Elizabeth and Newark Horse Railroad
Elizabeth Passenger Railway (PS)
Elizabeth, Plainfield and Central Jersey Railway (PS)
Elizabeth and Raritan River Street Railway (PS)
Elizabeth and Trenton Railroad (PS)
Essex Passenger Railway (PS)
Ewing Passenger Railway
Five Mile Beach Electric Railway
Grant Street Electric Railway (PS)
Hamilton Township Street Railway
Hoboken and Manhattan Railroad
Hudson and Bergen Railway (PS)
Hudson and Bergen Traction Company (PS)
Hudson and Manhattan Railroad
Hudson and Manhattan Railway
Hudson River Traction Company (PS)
Jersey Central Traction Company
Jersey City and Bergen Railroad (PS)
Jersey City, Harrison and Kearney Railway (PS)
Jersey City, Hoboken and Paterson Street Railway (PS)
Jersey City, Hoboken and Rutherford Electric Railway (PS) 
Keyport and Matawan Street Railway
Lakewood and Seashore Railroad
Middlesex and Somerset Traction Company (PS)
Millville Rapid Transit Company
Millville Traction Company
Mercer County Traction Company
Monmouth County Electric Railway
Monmouth Traction Company
Morris County Traction Company
Mount Holly Street Railway
Mountain Railway
Mulberry Street Passenger Railway
New Brunswick City Railway (PS)
New Jersey and Hudson River Railway and Ferry Company (PS)
New Jersey Interurban Company
New Jersey and Pennsylvania Traction Company
New Jersey Rapid Transit Company (PS)
New Jersey Short Line Railroad (PS)
New Jersey Traction Company (PS)
New Jersey Transit
New York – Philadelphia Company (PS)
New York and Philadelphia Traction Company (PS)
Newark, Bloomfield and Montclair Horse Railroad
Newark and Franklin Horse Railroad
Newark and Hackensack Traction Company (PS)
Newark and Irvington Street Railway (PS)
Newark Passenger Railway (PS)
Newark Plank Road Company (PS)
Newark and South Orange Horse Car Railroad (PS)
Newark and South Orange Railway (PS)
Newark, South Orange, Ferry Street and Hamilton Place Railroad (PS)

North Hudson County Railway (PS)
North Jersey Rapid Transit Company
North Jersey Street Railway (PS)
Northampton–Easton and Washington Traction Company
Ocean City Electric Railroad
Ocean City Electric Railway
Ocean Street Passenger Railway
Ogden Mine Railroad Company
Orange Crosstown and Orange Valley Street Railway
Orange Mountain Traction Company
Orange and Newark Railroad (PS)
Orange and Passaic Valley Railway (PS)
Palisades Railroad (PS)
Passaic, Garfield and Clifton Electric Railway (PS)
Passaic and Newark Electric Railway (PS)
Passaic and Newark Electric Traction Company (PS)
Passaic, Rutherford and Carlstadt Electric Railway (PS)
Paterson Horse Railroad (PS)
Paterson Railway (PS)
Paterson Central Railway (PS)
Paterson Central Electric Railway (PS)
Paterson City Railroad (PS)
Paterson, Garfield and Clifton Railway (PS)
Paterson and Little Falls Electric Railway (PS)
Paterson and Passaic Electric Railway (PS)
Paterson and Passaic Railroad (PS)
Paterson, Passaic and Rutherford Electric Railway (PS)
Paterson, Rutherford and Carlstadt Electric Railway (PS)
Paterson and State Line Traction Company (PS)
Paulsboro Traction Company
Pavonia Horse Railroad (PS)
Pennington Avenue Passenger Railway
People's Elevating Company (PS)
People's Park Railway (PS)
Perth Amboy Railway (PS)
Plainfield Street Railway (PS)
Point Pleasant Traction Company
Princeton Street Railway
Public Service Coordinated Transport (PS)
Public Service Corporation of New Jersey (PS)
Public Service Railroad (PS)
Public Service Railway (PS)
Rahway Electric Street Railway (PS)
Rapid Transit Railway of the City of Newark (PS)
Raritan Traction Company (PS)
Ridgefield and Teaneck Railway (PS)
Riverside Traction Company (PS)
Rutherford Railway (PS)
Saddle River Traction Company (PS)
Salem and Pennsgrove Traction Company
Seacoast Traction Company
Seashore Electric Railway
South Clinton Avenue and Broad Street Railway
South Jersey Street Railway
South Jersey Traction Company
South Orange and Maplewood Traction Company (PS)
Suburban Traction Company (PS)
Transport of New Jersey
Trenton, Hamilton and Ewing Traction Company
Trenton Horse Railroad
Trenton, Lakewood and Atlantic Railway
Trenton, Lakewood and Seacoast Railway
Trenton, Lawrenceville and Princeton Railroad
Trenton, Lawrenceville and Princeton Extension Railroad
Trenton and Mercer County Traction Corporation
Trenton and New Brunswick Railroad (PS)
Trenton, New Hope and Lambertville Street Railway
Trenton Passenger Railway
Trenton, Pennington and Hopewell Street Railway
Trenton–Princeton Traction Company
Trenton Street Railway
Trenton Terminal Railroad (PS)
Trenton Transit Company
Union Traction Company (PS) Originally the line was to run from Hackensack to Kearny, New Jersey but the company became insolvent and was merged into other trolley lines before the line could be fully built.
West End and Long Branch Railway
West Jersey Traction Company (PS)
Westfield and Elizabeth Street Railway (PS)
White Line Traction Company (PS)
Woodbridge and Sewaren Street Railway (PS)
Yardley, Morrisville and Trenton Street Railway

See also
List of Public Service Corporation of New Jersey precursors

References 
Joseph F. Eid, Jr. and Barker Gummere, published by Joseph F. Eid [remove second "Barker Gummere"]

External links
New Jersey Transit subsidiaries - Public Service and independent

 
New Jersey
Street railroad